The women's 800 metres event at the 2011 All-Africa Games was held on 11–12 September.

Medalists

Results

Heats
Qualification: First 3 of each heat (Q) and the next 2 fastest (q) qualified for the final.

Final

References
Results
Results

800
2011 in women's athletics